Continent was an airline based in Moscow, Russia. Its main base was Vnukovo International Airport.

History
Continent started passenger services in early 2010 but ceased operations on July 29, 2011 due to poor customer response and a lack of funds

Destinations

Fleet
The Continent fleet included the following aircraft:

References

External links
Fleet

Airlines established in 2010
Airlines disestablished in 2011
Defunct airlines of Russia
Companies based in Moscow